Rząśnik is a village in Wyszków County, Masovian Voivodeship, in east-central Poland. It is the seat of the gmina (administrative district) called Gmina Rząśnik.

The village has a population of 1,300.

References

Villages in Wyszków County